Moreno Mannini (born 15 August 1962) is an Italian former professional footballer who played as a right-back.

Club career
Born in Imola, Province of Bologna, Mannini started playing professionally with Calcio Como in Serie B, appearing in 36 games in his second season as the Lombardy team promoted to Serie A. In the following off-season he signed with fellow top-divisioner U.C. Sampdoria, where he remained for the following 15 years almost always as an undisputed starter. In the late 1980s and early 1990s he was part of a defensive sector which also included Gianluca Pagliuca, Luca Pellegrini, Pietro Vierchowod and Amedeo Carboni, with Roberto Mancini and Gianluca Vialli providing the goals.

During his spell with Samp, Mannini won four Coppa Italia and the 1991 national championship, scoring a crucial goal in the latter competition on 19 May in a 3–0 home win against U.S. Lecce. He also appeared in two UEFA finals in the 1990s, winning the UEFA Cup Winners' Cup against R.S.C. Anderlecht and losing the European Cup against FC Barcelona, the latter match played at Wembley.

In the 1999 summer, following Sampdoria's top level relegation, 37-year-old Mannini – who appeared in 510 official games for the club, netting eight times – left Genoa and signed for Nottingham Forest in the Football League Championship, reuniting at the English side with former Sampdoria teammate (and manager) David Platt. He made his official debut on 7 August 1999 in a 3–1 away loss against Ipswich Town, leaving in the following transfer window and closing out his career after a few months with his first team, amateurs Imolese Calcio 1919.

International career
Mannini gained ten caps for Italy, his debut coming on 19 February 1992 at nearly 30 years of age, in a 4–0 friendly win with San Marino in Cesena.

Barred by Giuseppe Bergomi first and Antonio Benarrivo later, he never attended any major international tournament, however.

Honours
Sampdoria
UEFA Cup Winners' Cup: 1989–90; runner-up 1988–89
Serie A: 1990–91
Coppa Italia: 1984–85, 1987–88, 1988–89, 1993–94; runner-up 1985–86, 1990–91
Italian Supercup: 1991; runner-up 1988, 1989, 1994
European Cup: runner-up 1991–92

References

External links

National team data  

1962 births
Living people
Italian footballers
Association football defenders
Italy international footballers
Serie A players
Serie B players
English Football League players
Como 1907 players
U.C. Sampdoria players
Nottingham Forest F.C. players
Imolese Calcio 1919 players
Italian expatriate footballers
Italian expatriate sportspeople in England
Expatriate footballers in England